Maurice Roche, 8th Viscount Fermoy (1597–1670) was an magnate and soldier in southern Ireland, and a politician of the Irish Catholic Confederation. He joined the rebels in the Irish Rebellion of 1641 in January 1642, early for Munster, by besieging Richard Boyle, 1st Earl of Cork, a Protestant, in Youghal. He fought for the Confederates in the Irish Confederate Wars and sat on three of their Supreme Councils. He fought against the Parliamentarians in the Cromwellian conquest of Ireland and was excluded from pardon at the surrender in 1652. At the restoration of the monarchy in 1660 he recovered his title but not his lands.

Birth and origins 

Maurice was born in 1597, probably in Castletownroche, County Cork, Munster, Ireland. He was the eldest son of David Roche, 7th Viscount Fermoy and his wife, Joan Barry. At the time of his birth, his grandfather was the 6th Viscount Fermoy (also counted as the 1st). His father was heir apparent and would succeed as the 7th Viscount in 1600. His father's family, the Roches were Old English and descended from Adam de Rupe who had come to Ireland from Wales with Robert FitzStephen during the Anglo-Norman invasion of Ireland.

Maurice's mother was a daughter of James de Barry, 4th Viscount Buttevant, by his wife Ellen MacCarthy Reagh. His mother's family, the de Barrys, were Old English like his own and descended from Philip de Barry, who had come to Ireland from Wales in 1183.

He was one of nine siblings, which are listed in his father's article. Of note are Redmond Roche, MP for  Cork County, and Ellen, who married Charles MacCarthy, 1st Viscount Muskerry as his second wife.

Marriage and children 
About 1625 Roche married Ellen (Eleanor), daughter of John Og Power, son and heir of Richard Power, 4th Baron Power of Curraghmore and sister of John Power, 5th Baron Power of Curraghmore.

 
Maurice and Ellen had two sons:
David (died 1681), succeeded as the 9th Viscount but died in London unmarried
John, succeeded as the 10th viscount and married Catharine Condon,

—and at least one daughter:
Ellen, married William, Lord Castle Connell

Viscount 
He succeeded his father as the 8th Viscount Fermoy on 22 March 1635. He is also counted as 3rd Viscount. Lord Fermoy took his seat in the House of Lords of the Parliament 1640–1649 on 26 October 1640.

Irish wars 
Ireland suffered 11 years of war from 1641 to 1652, which are usually divided into the Rebellion of 1641, the Confederate Wars, and the Cromwellian Conquest. This eleven years' war in turn formed part of the Wars of the three kingdoms, also known as the British Civil Wars.

Phelim O'Neill launched the Rebellion from the northern province of Ulster in October 1641. Fermoy was one of the first in the southern province of Munster to join the rebels and was the leader of the Confederates in Munster in the early times. In January 1642 Fermoy, together with Garret Barry, besieged Richard Boyle, 1st Earl of Cork, the most powerful of the Munster Protestants, in Youghal. The siege was soon relieved from Lismore Castle by troops under his sons-in-law George FitzGerald, 16th Earl of Kildare, and David Barry, 1st Earl of Barrymore. On 2 March 1642 Donough MacCarty, the 2nd Viscount Muskerry, joined the rebellion. Muskerry was Fermoy's nephew by marriage as Muskerry's father had married Fermoy's sister Ellen in 1599 as his second wife. In March and April, Muskerry and Fermoy with 4,000 men unsuccessfully besieged William St Leger, the Lord President of Munster, in Cork City. In May and June 1642, Muskerry, Garret Barry, Patrick Purcell of Croagh, and Fermoy attacked Limerick. The town opened its gates willingly, but the Protestants defended King John's Castle in the Siege of Limerick. The castle surrendered on 21 June. Fermoy was among the losers when Murrough O'Brien, 6th Baron of Inchiquin defeated the insurgeants at the Battle of Liscarroll on 3 September 1642.

When the insurgents organized themselves in the Irish Catholic Confederation, Fermoy was elected a member of the first Supreme Council, sitting from November 1642 to May 1643; and was re-elected for the second Supreme Council sitting from May 1643 to November 1643.

He then lost influence but made a come back in the seventh Supreme Council.

Later life 
Fermoy was excluded from pardon of life and estate in the Commonwealth's Act of Settlement on 12 August and therefore lost his estates.

At the Stuart Restoration he regained his title but not his estates.

Death, succession, and timeline 
Fermoy died on 22 March 1670 and was succeeded by his son David, a naval officier.

Notes and references

Notes

Citations

Sources 

 
 
 
 
  – 1642 to 1660
  – (for MacCarty and Roche)
 
  – Eardley of Spalding to Goojerat (for Fermoy)
 
 
 
 
 
 
 
  – (for timeline)
 
  – 1634 to 1699
 
  – Parliaments & Biographies (PDF downloadable from given URL)
  – Parliaments & Biographies (PDF downloadable from given URL)
 
 
 
 
 
 
 
 
  – 1643 to 1660 and index

1593 births
1670 deaths
Normans in Ireland
Irish Roman Catholic Confederates
Viscounts in the Peerage of Ireland